Karl Brauneder (born 13 March 1960 in Vösendorf, Austria) is a retired football defender. During his club career, Brauneder played for Wiener Sport-Club, Rapid Wien and Stahl Linz.

External links
 
 

1960 births
Living people
Austrian footballers
Austria international footballers
Association football defenders
Wiener Sport-Club players
SK Rapid Wien players
Austrian Football Bundesliga players
Austrian football managers
1. Simmeringer SC managers